Sebastian Forke (born 13 March 1987 in Karl-Marx-Stadt) is a German former professional cyclist.

Major results
2007
1st Stage 1 Brandenburg-Rundfahrt
2010
1st Overall Dookoła Mazowsza
1st Stages 1, 2, 3, 4
2013
1st Stage 4 Course de la Solidarité Olympique
1st Ronde van Midden-Nederland

References

External links

1987 births
Living people
German male cyclists
Sportspeople from Chemnitz
Cyclists from Saxony